Peter Liversidge (born 1973) is a British contemporary artist notable for his diverse artistic practice and use of proposals.

Personal life
Peter Liversidge studied Fine Art in Exeter at the University of Plymouth and film and photography at Montana State University-Bozeman. He moved to London in 1996 where he now lives with his wife and two children.

Work
Over the course of the last 12 years, using an Olivetti typewriter, Liversidge has created proposals for exhibitions that range from the simple to the impossible. He experiments with what he describes as the "notion of creativity", often realised as objects, performances, or happenings over the course of an exhibition. Liversidge says of his proposals that: "...it's important that some of the proposals are actually realized, but no more so that the others that remain only as text on a piece of A4 paper. In a sense they are all possible and the bookwork that collates the proposals allows the reader to curate their own show, and because of its size and scale the bookwork allows an individual to interact with each of the proposals on their own terms, one to one."

He draws inspiration not just from artists such as On Kawara, Fischli and Weiss, but also from artists such as Joseph Cornell and the Reverend Howard Finster, as well as inveterate tinkerers like his own grandfathers. Liversidge is driven by the generative notion of creativity and the idea that art is most successful when it exists slightly outside of formalist notions of fine art. The physical objects Liversidge produces often include banal, everyday materials that are repurposed or co-opted for his use. His work, as seen in a lot of his proposals, requires the presence of the viewer and their interpretation of the proposals to complete the aesthetic experience.

Liversidge has worked with, and exhibited at, Tate Liverpool in 2008, the Centre d'Art Santa Mònica, Barcelona in 2008, Bloomberg SPACE, London in 2009 and the Scottish National Gallery of Modern Art in 2010. He has also developed projects for Cab Gallery, the Frieze Art Fair, (with Ingleby Gallery), the Europalia Festival in 2007, Art Basel, Miami, in 2009 and Edinburgh's Sculpture Park, Jupiter Artland, also in 2009.

His performances, such as Gin Stand, Plum Bread and Embossing Bank Notes present the viewers with a piece of work to take away with them. Another aspect of Liversidge's work is sending various objects through the post. "For Peter Liversidge the postal service is also a collaborator in the work. The attached post labels and alterations are like contributions to the piece."

He has also created video projections for the bands Wires Under Tension and Balmorhea. In April 2012, Liversidge created the stage design and projection backdrop for Low at the Royal Festival Hall as a specific proposal. He again worked in collaboration with the band on their 2013 tour, creating the stage design and projection at London's Barbican Centre in April 2013. In October 2014, Liversidge collaborated with musicians Julia Kent and Rachel Grimes on 11 new compositions to mark the end of his exhibition, dopplegänger, at The MAC in Belfast.

In 2015, Liversidge created the cover for the album Ones and Sixes by the band Low. He worked with the band again to create the cover for their 2018 album Double Negative.

For the opening of the Tate Modern extension in June 2016, Liversidge presented a choral piece for 500 singers.

Selected published proposals

Proposals for Bonniers Konsthall, 2018.
Proposals for the Government Art Collection, 2017.
Proposals for Nils Frahm, 2016.
Proposals for the Aldrich Contemporary Art Museum, 2016.
Proposals for the residents of Sceaux Gardens, 2015.
Proposals for Reykjavik, 2014.
Proposals for basis, 2014.
Proposals for Frome, 2014.
Proposals for The Royal London Hospital, 2014.
Proposals for Printed Matter, Inc., 2014.
Proposals for Santarcangelo, 2013.
Whitechapel Proposals, 2013.
Proposals for Kiasma, 2012.
Proposals for The Flag Club, 2012.
Proposals for Huntley, 2011.
Proposals for Sean Kelly Gallery, 2011.
Proposals for the Scottish National Gallery of Modern Art, 2010.
Proposals for Town Hall Hotels & Apartments, 2010.
Ingleby Proposals, 2010.
Bloomberg Proposals, 2009.
Jupiter Proposals, 2009.
Proposals for Liverpool, 2008.
Fair Proposals, 2007.
Festival Proposals, 2006.
Proposals 1997–2005, 2005.

Selected publications
Peter Liversidge - Surface Mail (or The Limitations of Magic), 2017.
Twofold, 2016.
Selected Proposals, 2013.
What You'd Expect, 2004.

References

External links

Sean Kelly Gallery – Peter Liversidge
Ingleby Gallery – Peter Liversidge
Interview with Peter Liversidge for Aesthetica Magazine
Performance of The Bridge at Tate Modern

1973 births
Living people
English contemporary artists
Alumni of the University of Plymouth